Sunnyside is a historic plantation house and complex located near Newsoms, Southampton County, Virginia. The house was built in three stages dating to about 1815, 1847, and 1870.  It is a two-story, "T"-shaped frame dwelling. The main section was built in 1870, and has Greek Revival and Italianate design elements.  The front facade features an imposing, two-story, pedimented portico sheltering the main entrance. Also on the property are 13 contributing outbuildings: a schoolhouse, school master's house, dairy, milk house, tenant's house, privy, pump house, sheds, peanut barn, a tall smokehouse, kitchen-laundry, and a garage.

It was listed on the National Register of Historic Places in 1979.

References

Plantation houses in Virginia
Houses on the National Register of Historic Places in Virginia
Greek Revival houses in Virginia
Italianate architecture in Virginia
Houses completed in 1815
Houses in Southampton County, Virginia
National Register of Historic Places in Southampton County, Virginia